The last bell (Posledniy zvonok) is a traditional ceremony in the schools of Russia and some other post-Soviet countries. The celebration is carried out just after all the studies are finished, but before the final exams. The date usually falls on 25 May. The pupils that are about to leave the school don the classic school uniform or formal dress; for the girls it has become customary since the 1990s to attire in the Soviet-style school uniform with white aprons and white bows in the hair. A symbolic last school bell is rung, usually by a first-grader.

See also 
School bell
Knowledge day

References

External links 

Education in Russia
May observances
Observances in Russia
Spring (season) events in Russia